Dániel Gera (born 29 August 1995) is a professional Hungarian footballer who plays as a forward for Diósgyőr.

Club career
On 31 August 2022, Gera signed with Diósgyőr.

Career statistics

References

External links
 
 

1995 births
Footballers from Budapest
Living people
Hungarian footballers
Hungary under-21 international footballers
Association football midfielders
MTK Budapest FC players
Ferencvárosi TC footballers
Puskás Akadémia FC players
Diósgyőri VTK players
Nemzeti Bajnokság I players
Nemzeti Bajnokság II players